John Walsh (1 July 1726 – 9 March 1795) was a British scientist and Secretary to the Governor of Bengal.

John was son of Joseph Walsh, Secretary to the Governor of Fort St. George and cousin to Nevil Maskelyne, the Astronomer Royal, and his sister Margaret, the wife of Lord Clive.

Life
He entered the English East India Company at the age of fifteen and eventually became Clive's private secretary. During the 1757 Plassey campaign against the Nawab of Bengal, Siraj ud-Daulah, John Walsh was awarded £56,000 in prize money. Upon his return to England in 1759, his fortune was estimated at £147,000, and he quickly sought to purchase the necessary trappings of aristocratic power in eighteenth century Britain: land and political influence. In late 1764, Walsh purchased the large estate of Warfield Park, near Bracknell in Berkshire and spent the next two years doing it up. He was MP for Worcester from 1761 to 1780. He continued to serve Robert Clive, or 'Clive of India' as he became known, and attempted to form a parliamentary interest in his favour.

In later life, John Walsh's interests were scientific, with a particular interest in electric fish. He was elected a Fellow of the Royal Society in 1770 and awarded their Copley Medal in 1773 for a paper on the electrical properties of torpedo fish.

Upon his death in 1795, Sir John Walsh, as he was then known, left his fortune to his niece, Margaret Walsh, and her husband, John Benn, on the condition that they change their surname to Benn-Walsh. With his own fortune of £80,000 made in India while Assistant to the Resident of Benares, his brother-in-law Francis Fowke in the 1770s, John Benn-Walsh had become a very wealthy man and went on to inherit extensive estates in Warfield, Buckinghamshire, in Radnorshire, and in Ormathwaite, Cumberland and be created Baron Ormathwaite.

References

External links
 Drawing of John Walsh from the Royal Berkshire History website

1726 births
1795 deaths
People from Warfield
Members of the Parliament of Great Britain for English constituencies
British MPs 1761–1768
British MPs 1768–1774
British MPs 1774–1780
British zoologists
Fellows of the Royal Society
Recipients of the Copley Medal
British East India Company people
18th-century British people
18th-century British scientists
18th-century British zoologists